Cryptocarya chinensis, commonly known as the Chinese cryptocarya, is a medium-sized evergreen tree native to the subtropical forests of Taiwan,  southern China (Fujian, Guangdong, Guangxi, Hainan, Sichuan), and Japan.

References

chinensis
Trees of China
Trees of Japan
Trees of Taiwan
Plants described in 1882